Anbudan Kushi is a Tamil language drama airing on Star Vijay. It premiered on 27 January 2020 and ended on 13 August 2021 with 341 episodes. It stars initially with Prajin, Mansi Joshi and Arvind Sivakumar. Later Joshi was replaced by Reshma and followed Shreya Anchan, then Sivakumar was replaced by Lokesh.

Plot 
Anbu, a young lad is a servant who works at Kushi's house. After a long time, Kushi comes back from Rajasthan to Chennai. She hopes to start studying fashion designing and work. However, her father Aditya Lal arranges her marriage to Sudhish, unaware that he is a criminal. Also Sudhish's sister, Maya, is seeking revenge for Aditya Lal killing her lover Shankar in 1996. Kushi secretly starts to study fashion designing. when Anbu finds out, he warns her about her father's anger. Anbu is also a professional boxer, and he has a match against Kuttipuli. Maya and Sudhish persuade Kuttipuli to murder Anbu in the boxing ring and give him money. Then Naresh and Sudhish put sleeping pills in Anbu's drink and tells Kushi to give it to Anbu. Not knowing that Anbu's drink was spiked, she gives it to Anbu and Anbu loses his game. At the hospital Anbu finds out that his drink was spiked, and he goes to Kushi's house and argues with Kushi. Aditya Lal overhears their conversation and calls out on Anbu's betrayal.

For Kushi's marriage, Aditya Lal invites Anbu's family except Anbu. Kushi finds out Sudhish is a criminal and begs her father to cancel the wedding, but he refuses. Sudhish threatens Kushi not to say a word; otherwise, he will kill Aditya Lal. On the day of the wedding, Kushi runs away. She ends up at Anbu's home, when her family comes to take her back, she shows her thali and says she is  married to Anbu. Kushi's father is outraged and hurts Anbu. Anbu is angry at Kushi for saying he married her. Anbu asks Kushi to leave soon so Kushi asks Anbu to give her a few months to solve her problems.

Anbu and Kushi are childhood friends. Since childhood they never see eye to eye and are constantly fighting. After Kushi comes to Anbu's home and acts as Anbu's wife she gradually falls in love with Anbu. However, Anbu reminds Kushi that she will be going abroad for her studies soon. Anbu keeps saying that he only sees Kushi as his boss's daughter and a good friend. The rest of the story is about how Anbu solves his sister Selvi's marriage problems and accepts Kushi as his wife.

Cast

Main
 Prajin Padmanabhan as Anbu, a cab driver, a professional boxer, formerly Aditya Lal's right-hand man turned Kushi's husband (2020–2021)
 Reshma Venkatesh (2020–Apr.2021): A fashion designer, turned Anbu's wife 
 Mansi Joshi as Kushi (Jan.2020–Mar.2020) as Kushi (Replaced by Reshma)
 Shreya Anchan (2021–Aug.2021) as Kushi (Replacement of Reshma)
 Although Kushi's character was replaced there was only one dubbing artist for Kushi throughout the serial this was Akshaya Praba. 
 Arvind Sivakumar (2020) as Sudhish; Mayavathi's Younger Brother (Main Antagonist)
 Lokesh Baskaran replaced Sivakumar (2020–2021)

Recurring
 Deepa Shankar (2020–2021) as Rajeshwari replaced Shari: Anbu's mother, tailor 
 Shandhana  (2020) as Rajeswari (Replaced by Deepa Shankar)
 Meera Krishna as Madhuri Aditya Lal: Kushi's mother
 Seenu (2021) as Aditya Lal: Kushi's father, businessman (Replacement of Suresh Krishnamurthi)
 Suresh Krishnamurthi (2020-2021) as Aditya Lal
 Kausalya Senthamarai as Aditya Lal's mother, Kushi's grandmother (2020–2021)
 Arumuga Vel as Danasekar: Anbu's father, security guard, formerly a driver
 Sabari Krish as Arivu, Anbu's younger brother 
 VJ Tara as Meena, Anbu's younger sister
 Dhanasekar as Kumaresan: Rajeswari's brother; Anbu's uncle, an astrologer
 Gowthami Vembunathan as Revathi, Kumaresan's wife;
 Mani KL as Abu, one of Anbu's best friends
 Samyutha as Shalini, Abu's younger sister (2021)
 Adhi as Tommy, Anbu's friend, mechanic
 Sathya Rajaaa as Thomas, one of Anbu's best friends, a boxer
 Balasubramaniyan Rajendran as Michael, Anbu's friend
 Priya as Senthamarai, Dhanasekar's sister (Episode 295)
 Sailu Imran as Parvathy, Anbu's cousin (Episode 295)
 Aarthi Ramkumar as Mayavathi; Villain, Sudhish's sister
 Banu Mathy as Soniya; Fake Maya
 Mahesh Prabha as Inspector Vignesh
 Rajesh as Thayalan's father
 Babitha Jose as Mangalam, Thayalan's mother
 Ajai Bharat as Thayalan, Selvi's husband, a teacher
 Sunitha as Selvi Thayalan, Anbu's sister
 Vidhya as Priya, Thayalan's sister
 Madhu as Gokul
 Preetha Reddy as Pooja: Kushi's cousin
 Rajesh Korn as Naresh: Kushi's brother
 Arvind Khathare as Kishore, Kushi's relative

References 

Star Vijay original programming
2020s Tamil-language television series
Tamil-language romance television series
2020 Tamil-language television series debuts
Tamil-language television shows
2021 Tamil-language television series endings